Knefastia limonensis is an extinct species of sea snail, a marine gastropod mollusk in the family Pseudomelatomidae, the turrids and allies.

Description
The length of the shell attains 54 mm.

Distribution
This extinct marine species was found in Pliocene strata of northern Costa Rica and Miocene strata of Colombia and Panama; age range:  15.97 to 2.588 Ma

References

 A. A. Olsson. 1922. The Miocene of Northern Costa Rica. Bulletins of American Paleontology 9(39):1-309
 B. Landau and C. Marques da Silva. 2010. Early Pliocene gastropods of Cubagua, Venezuela: Taxonomy, palaeobiogeography and ecostratigraphy. Palaeontos 19:1-221

External links
 Fossilworks: Knefastia limonensis

limonensis
Gastropods described in 1965
Miocene gastropods